Wierzchowo  (formerly German Virchow) is a village in Drawsko County, West Pomeranian Voivodeship, in north-western Poland. It is the seat of the gmina (administrative district) called Gmina Wierzchowo.

Before 1945 the area was part of Prussia. For the history of the region, see History of Pomerania.

The village has a population of 1,500.

References

Wierzchowo